Carinispa nevermanni is a species of leaf beetle found in the family Chrysomelidae. It is found in Central America.

References 

Cassidinae
Beetles described in 1930